The Danube Institute is a center-right think tank and humanistic study center founded in 2013 and based in Budapest, Hungary. The institute is financed through the Batthyány Foundation (BLA) and receives Hungarian state funding. According to its mission statement, the Danube Institute is dedicated to “a respectful conservatism in cultural, religious, and social life, the broad classical liberal tradition in economics, and a realistic Atlanticism in national security policy.”

The institute's president is John O'Sullivan. Central European politicians associated with the Danube Institute include János Martonyi and Ryszard Legutko. Fellows as of 2023 include religious movements researcher Jeffrey Kaplan, political philosopher Ofir Haivry, conservative author Rod Dreher, historian of Christian political thought David Dusenbury, and sociologist Eric Hendriks-Kim. Research director is political scientist David Martin Jones.

In 2019, a video of remarks made by Tim Montgomerie at a meeting hosted by the Danube Institute was published, creating a controversy regarding his views on the Hungarian government. Other politicians who have spoken at Danube Institute meetings include the Australian politicians Tony Abbott and Kevin Andrews, and Václav Havel, the former president of Czechoslovakia and then of the Czech Republic. In 2021, the French politician Éric Zemmour gave an interview to the institute.

References

Further reading

External links 
 Homepage of the Institute

Think tanks based in Hungary
2013 establishments